The Egyptian Expedition, in mid-1882, was the United States' response to the British attack on Alexandria during the Anglo-Egyptian War. To protect American citizens and their property within the city, three United States Navy ships were sent to Egypt with orders to observe the conflict offshore and make a landing if necessary. Following the bombardment, a force of American marines and sailors were landed and they assisted in fire fighting and guarding the American consulate.

Rear Admiral James W. Nicholson, commander of the European Squadron, was directed to lead the expedition in the screw sloop USS Lancaster. Nicholson arrived at Alexandria on June 27, 1882, the gunboat USS Nipsic on July 1 and the corvette USS Quinnebaug on July 12. A joint British and French fleet, under Admiral Beauchamp Seymour, began anchoring off Alexandria on May 20 but the bombardment did not begin until July 11, after the French had refused to participate. The Americans were informed by the British of their intentions so Rear Admiral Nicholson was able to warn the United States citizens within the city of a pending attack. When the engagement began, the British started shooting at the various forts under the command of Colonel Ahmed Orabi. The Egyptians defended the city, striking the British ships several times though eventually the fortifications were reduced and silenced over the course of two days. During the bombardment, the Americans opened their ships up to all refugees from the city who needed shelter or medical treatment.

By July 14, the attack was over but Alexandria was in a state of anarchy and burning. Remnants of Orabi's rebels, and elements of the civilian population, were attacking foreign residents, including Americans and in response Nicholson decided to send a landing party ashore. Captain Henry C. Cochrane of the Marine Corps, and two lieutenants, were assigned to command a force of seventy marines and fifty-seven sailors with orders to occupy the American consulate, patrol the city, and fight the spreading fires which were ravaging the European section of Alexandria. The landing party was the first contingent of foreign troops to enter the city center after the bombardment, they were later followed by an occupation force 4,000 Britons and the troops of other nations. By July 20, conditions in the city had largely improved so most of the marines and sailors were withdrawn except for a small force from USS Quinnebaug under Lieutenant Frank L. Denny which was removed on July 24, ending the operation.

See also
Battle of Taku Forts (1859)
Battle of Kororareka

References

Egypt
Egypt
Egypt
Punitive expeditions of the United States
Egypt–United States relations
Conflicts in 1882
June 1882 events
July 1882 events